Vladimir II may refer to:

 Vladimir II, Prince of Novgorod (1020–1052)
 Vladimir II Monomakh (1053–1125)
 Vladimir II of Duklja, Prince of Duklja, from 1103 to 1113
 Vladimir II, Prince of Pereyaslavl (r. 1170–1187)
 Vladimir II Yaroslavich (?–1198/1199)

See also
 Vladimir (disambiguation)